Richard Pilkington may refer to:

Richard Pilkington (Newton MP) (1841–1908), British Member of Parliament for Newton (1899–1906), member of the Pilkington glass-manufacturing family
Richard Pilkington (politician, born 1908) (1908–1976), British soldier and Member of Parliament for Widnes (1935–1945), and Poole (1951–1964)
Richard Pilkington (bowls), lawn bowls competitor for New Zealand
Richard Pilkington (priest) (died 1631), Anglican priest